The Asia Council is a pan-Asian organization constituted in 2016 to serve as a continent wide forum to address Asia's key challenges and foster cooperation among countries of Asia.
The council has its headquarters in Tokyo and regional directorates in Doha, Chengdu and Bangkok.

Organization
The Asia Council operates through the council headquarters in Tokyo, three regional directorates and country offices.

Administrative Divisions
The Asia Council is organized into three administrative divisions. The East Asia division has its regional directorate in Tokyo, the South Asia & South East Asia division has its regional directorate in Bangkok and the West Asia & Central Asia division has its regional directorate in Doha.

Countries
The Asia Council covers 48 countries and 6 dependent territories.

Fellowships
The Asia Council fellowship provides financial grant to students from Asian countries to study for a graduate degree in world's top universities.

Global Leaders Fellowship
The Asia Council Global Leaders Fellowship is an international graduate fellowship scheme which supports students with exceptional leadership qualities from 48 countries and 6 dependent territories of Asia to undertake graduate studies at some of world's top universities in United States and United Kingdom.

Asia Fellowship
The Asia Fellowship is an international graduate fellowship scheme which supports students with exceptional leadership qualities from 48 countries and 6 dependent territories of Asia to undertake graduate studies at Asia’s top universities.

Einstein Fellowship
The Asia Council Einstein Fellowship is an international fellowship scheme which supports students with exceptional leadership qualities from 48 countries and 6 dependent territories of Asia to undertake study for a degree at Tokyo Institute of Technology, Nanyang Technological University, KAIST, Hong Kong University of Science and Technology, and Tsinghua University.

Reports and Publications
The council's research and publishing division produces several reports on Asia including the Asia Security Report and Asia Statistical Report.

Asian Review
The Asian Review is a journal published by the Asia Council. It covers political, economic and strategic review of the continent.

Events

Asia Roundtable
The Asia Roundtable is an international conference held by the Asia Council outside Asia. The meeting discusses in detail a single issue that is geopolitically significant for the Asian region. The conference is attended by regional leaders and policy experts.

Asia Security Dialogue
The Asia Security Dialogue is a bi-annual meeting held by the Asia Council on most pressing security issues relating Asia.

See also

Association of Southeast Asian Nations
East Asia Summit
Shanghai Cooperation Organisation
Asian Development Bank

References

External links
 
 Asian Review

International organizations based in Asia
Organizations based in Tokyo
Foreign relations of Asia
Diplomacy
Geopolitics
Global politics
International relations
International security